Melittia is a genus of moths in the family Sesiidae.

Species
Melittia abyssiniensis  Hampson, 1919
Melittia acosmetes  Hampson, 1919
Melittia afonini  Gorbunov & Arita, 1999
Melittia amboinensis  Felder, 1861
Melittia arcangelii  Giacomelli, 1911
Melittia astarte (Westwood, 1848)
Melittia auriplumia  Hampson, 1910
Melittia aureosquamata (Wallengren, 1863)
Melittia aurociliata (Aurivillius, 1879)
Melittia azrael  Le Cerf, 1914
Melittia bella  Arita & Gorbunov, 1996
Melittia bergii  Edwards, 1883
Melittia binghami  Niceville, 1900
Melittia bombyliformis Cramer, 1782
Melittia boulleti  Le Cerf, 1917
Melittia brabanti  Le Cerf, 1917
Melittia burmana  Le Cerf, 1916b
Melittia butleri  Druce, 1883
Melittia calabaza  Duckworth & Eichlin, 1973
Melittia callosoma  Hampson, 1919
Melittia celebica  Le Cerf, 1916
Melittia chalconota  Hampson, 1910
Melittia chalybescens  Miskin, 1892
Melittia chrysobapta  Hampson, 1919
Melittia chrysogaster  Walker, [1865]
Melittia chimana  Le Cerf, 1916
Melittia combusta (Le Cerf, 1916)
Melittia congoana  Le Cerf, 1916
Melittia congruens  Swinhoe, 1890
Melittia cristata  Arita & Gorbunov, 2002
Melittia cucphuongae  Arita & Gorbunov, 2000
Melittia cucurbitae (Harris, 1828)
Melittia cyaneifera  Walker, 1856
Melittia dichroipus  Hampson, 1919
Melittia distincta  Le Cerf, 1916
Melittia distinctoides  Arita & Gorbunov, 2000
Melittia doddi  Le Cerf, 1916
Melittia ectothyris  Hampson, 1919
Melittia eichlini  Friedlander, 1986
Melittia endoxantha  Hampson, 1919
Melittia erythrina  Diakonoff, 1954
Melittia eurytion (Westwood, 1848)
Melittia faulkneri  Eichlin, 1992
Melittia ferroptera  Kallies & Arita, 1998
Melittia flaviventris  Hampson, 1919
Melittia formosana  Matsumura, 1911
Melittia formosana formosana Matsumura, 1911
Melittia formosana nagaii Arita & Gorbunov, 1997
Melittia fulvipes  Kallies & Arita, 2004
Melittia funesta  Le Cerf, 1917
Melittia gephyra  Gaede, 1933
Melittia gigantea  Moore, 1879
Melittia gilberti  Eichlin, 1992
Melittia gloriosa  Edwards, 1880
Melittia gorochovi  Gorbunov, 1988a
Melittia grandis (Strecker, 1881)
Melittia haematopis  Fawcett, 1916
Melittia hampsoni  Beutenmüller, 1894
Melittia hervei  Le Cerf, 1917
Melittia houlberti  Le Cerf, 1917
Melittia hyaloxantha Meyrick, 1928
Melittia imperator  Rothschild, 1911
Melittia inouei  Arita & Yata, 1987
Melittia indica  Butler, 1874
Melittia javana  Le Cerf, 1916
Melittia josepha  Le Cerf, 1916
Melittia khmer  Le Cerf, 1917
Melittia kulluana  Moore, 1888
Melittia laboissierei  Le Cerf, 1917
Melittia lagopus  Boisduval, [1875]
Melittia laniremis (Wallengren, 1859)
Melittia latimargo  Butler, 1874
Melittia lentistriata  Hampson, 1919
Melittia leucogaster  Hampson, 1919
Melittia louisa  Le Cerf, 1916
Melittia luzonica  Gorbunov & Arita, 1996
Melittia madureae  Le Cerf, 1916
Melittia magnifica  Beutenmüller, 1900
Melittia meeki  Le Cerf, 1916
Melittia moluccaensis  Hampson, 1919
Melittia moni  de Freina, 2007
Melittia necopina  Kallies & Arita, 2004
Melittia nepalensis  Gorbunov & Arita, 1999
Melittia nepcha  Moore, 1879
Melittia newara  Moore, 1879
Melittia nigra (Le Cerf, 1917)
Melittia nilgiriensis  Gorbunov & Arita, 1999b
Melittia notabilis  Swinhoe, 1890
Melittia oberthueri  Le Cerf, 1916
Melittia oedipus  Oberthür, 1878
Melittia pauper  Le Cerf, 1916b
Melittia pellecta  Swinhoe, 1890
Melittia pijiae  Arita & Kallies, 2000
Melittia phorcus (Westwood, 1848)
Melittia propria  Kallies & Arita, 2003
Melittia proxima  Le Cerf, 1917
Melittia powelli Le Cerf, 1917
Melittia pulchripes  Walker, 1856
Melittia pulchripes pulchripes Walker, 1856
Melittia pulchripes dangeloi Köhler, 1941
Melittia pyropis  Hampson, 1919
Melittia romieuxi  Gorbunov & Arita, 1996
Melittia rufescens (Le Cerf, 1916)
Melittia rufodorsa  Hampson, 1910a
Melittia rugia  Druce, 1910
Melittia rutilipes  Walker, [1865]
Melittia sangaica  Moore, 1877
Melittia sangaica sangaica Moore, 1877
Melittia sangaica nipponica Arita & Yata, 1987
Melittia scoliiformis  Schade, 1938
Melittia senohi  Arita & Gorbunov, 2000
Melittia siamica  Walker, [1865]
Melittia simonyi  Rebel, 1899
Melittia smithi  Druce, 1889
Melittia snowii  Edwards, 1882
Melittia staudingeri  Boisduval, [1875]
Melittia strigipennis  Walker, [1865]
Melittia sukothai  Arita & Gorbunov, 1996
Melittia sulphureopyga  Le Cerf, 1916
Melittia sumatrana  Le Cerf, 1916
Melittia superba  Rothschild, 1909
Melittia suzukii  Gorbunov & Arita, 1999
Melittia tabanus  Le Cerf, 1916b
Melittia taiwanensis  Arita & Gorbunov, 2002
Melittia tayuyana  Bruch, 1941
Melittia tigripes  Diakonoff, 1954
Melittia tibialis (Drury, 1773)
Melittia uenoi  Arita & Gorbunov, 2000
Melittia umbrosa  Zukowsky, 1936
Melittia usambara  Le Cerf, 1917
Melittia volatilis  Swinhoe, 1890
Melittia xanthodes  Diakonoff, 1954
Melittia xanthogaster  Hampson, 1919
Melittia xanthopus  Le Cerf, 1916

References

Sesiidae